Julius Joseph Dinder (9 March 1830 - 30 May 1890) was a German Bishop of the Roman Catholic Church, and Archbishop of Poznań and Gniezno, and the Primate of Poland in the years 1886- 1890.

Early life
He was born in Rößel, Ermland in East Prussia (modern Reszel, Warmia, Poland). He studied Theology in the Lycaeum Hosianum in Braunsberg and was ordained on June 8, 1856. he was a vicar in Bischofsburg, then a pastor in Grieslienen, working among Ermland's / Warmian Catholics, where he learned the Polish language. In 1868, he was made a pastor of the parish in Königsberg in Prussia, ranked provost at the provostry church there, and was appointed Dean of Samland, and honorary canon of Ermland.

Rise to Primate
He was the first non-Polish Primate of Poland in several hundred years. His rise to the office was at the promotion of Otto von Bismarck, who wanted a German in the role, as part of his Germanisation-politics.  Bismarck put pressure on the Vatican to appoint Dinder. Pope Leo XIII, decided not to exacerbate a conflict with the German Empire.

His appointment was opposed by the polish Chancellor and the majority of the clergy.

Career as Primate
Dinder was an appointment of the German Emperor, and supported pro-German policies. However, in 1888 he asked the clergy to abstain from all political statements. Poland that this time was not a state and he encouraged the use of German in schools instead of Polish. 
He also appointed several German priests, however in what could be seen as a conciliatory action did appoint Prussian Poles Joseph Cybichowski as vicar-general, Edward Likowski as Bishop of Poznań and Jan Korytkowski as assistant in Gniezno (Gnesen).

Latter life
He died in Posen on 30 May 1890. "Kurier Poznański" wrote of him "everything you did, had a sense of Justice and kindness, which indeered him in hearts and minds".

References

External links
 Virtual tour Gniezno Cathedral 
List of Primates of Poland 

1830 births
1890 deaths
19th-century German Roman Catholic bishops
Bishops of Poznań
Archbishops of Gniezno
People from Kętrzyn County
People from East Prussia
Catholic clergy of the Prussian partition